Safia Amajan (1941-25 September 2006), also spelt Ama-jan, Ama Jan, Ahmed-jan and Ahmed Jan, was an Afghan women's rights activist, educator, politician, and critic of the Taliban's suppression of women.

Amajan worked as teacher and principal in Kandahar prior to the rise of the Taliban in 1996. During the subsequent Taliban regime, during which all girls' schools were closed, Amajan secretly taught girls in her home.

Following the defeat of the Taliban in 2001, Amajan served as the provincial director for the Ministry of Women's Affairs' office in Kandahar Province, a role she held from 2002 until her death. During her tenure, Amajan opened multiple vocational colleagues, training hundreds of women in trades including baking and tailoring.

On 25 September 2006, Amajan was shot four times and killed in front of her home in Kandahar by two men on a motorcycle. Amajan had previously asked the Afghan government to provide her with personal bodyguards in light of death threats from Taliban-led insurgents, but her request had been rejected. Amajan's murder was condemned by Hamid Karzai, then-President of Afghanistan, and the United Nations Assistance Mission in Afghanistan. Following her death, an alleged Taliban spokesperson stated Amajan's death had been in response to her working for the government.

Amajan was survived by her son, Naqibullah.

References and notes

External links

International Herald Tribune, 25 September 2006: Gunmen kill director of women's affairs for southern Afghanistan

1941 births
2006 deaths
Afghan murder victims
Assassinated activists
20th-century Afghan educators
Afghan feminists
Deaths by firearm in Afghanistan
People murdered in Afghanistan
Pashtun women
Violence against women in Afghanistan
Afghan women activists